Orcinol is an organic compound with the formula CH3C6H3(OH)2. It occurs in many species of lichens including Roccella tinctoria and Lecanora. Orcinol has been detected in the "toxic glue" of the ant species Camponotus saundersi. It is a colorless solid. It is related to resorcinol, 1,3-C6H4(OH)2.

Synthesis and reactions
Orcinol was first prepared by dehydroacetic acid, a conversion that involved ring-opening of the pyrone to a triketone.  This early experiment helped establish the rich condensation chemistry of polyketides.
It can be obtained by fusing extract of aloes with potash, followed by acidification. 

It undergoes O-methylation with dimethylsulfate.

It is used in the production of the dye orcein and as a reagent in some chemical tests for pentoses, such as Bial's Test. It may be synthesized from toluene; more interesting is its production when acetone dicarboxylic ester is condensed with the aid of sodium. It crystallizes in colorless prisms with one molecule of water, which redden on exposure to air. Ferric chloride gives a bluish-violet coloration with the aqueous solution. Unlike resorcinol it does not give a fluorescein with phthalic anhydride. Oxidation of the ammoniacal solution gives orcein, C28H24N2O7, the chief constituent of the natural dye archil. 4-Methylcatechol is an isomer, found as its methyl ether (creosol) in beech-wood tar.

Production from shale oil 
Orcinol is also found in shale oil produced from Kukersite oil shale. It is the main water-soluble phenol in the oil, and has been extracted and refined industrially by Viru Keemia Grupp.

See also 
 Orcinol 2-monooxygenase
 Orsellinate decarboxylase

References 

 

Alkylresorcinols